Kureh-ye Bi Barg Khan (also Romanized as Kūreh-ye Bī Barg Khān) is a village in Gowhar Kuh Rural District, Nukabad District, Khash County, Sistan and Baluchestan Province, Iran. At the 2006 census, its population was 39, in 6 families.

References 

Populated places in Khash County